Dino Urbani (8 March 1882 – 9 May 1958) was an Italian fencer who took part in the 1920 Olympics in Antwerp.

Urbani was Olympic champion in fencing twice. He was part of the Italian team that won the team competitions both in epee and foil.

References

1882 births
1958 deaths
Italian male épée fencers
Olympic fencers of Italy
Fencers at the 1920 Summer Olympics
Olympic gold medalists for Italy
Olympic medalists in fencing
Sportspeople from Livorno
Medalists at the 1920 Summer Olympics
Italian male sabre fencers